Kava is a commune in the Cercle of San in the Ségou Region of Mali. The principal town lies at Heremakono. As of 1998 the commune had a population of 10,699.

References

Communes of Ségou Region